The canton of Enne et Alzou is an administrative division of the Aveyron department, southern France. It was created at the French canton reorganisation which came into effect in March 2015. Its seat is in Aubin.

It consists of the following communes:
 
Anglars-Saint-Félix
Aubin
Auzits
Belcastel
Bournazel
Cransac
Escandolières
Firmi
Goutrens
Mayran
Rignac

References

Cantons of Aveyron